Sphaerobasidioscypha is a genus of fungi in the Cyphellaceae family. The genus contains two species found in New Zealand and Venezuela.

References

Cyphellaceae
Agaricales genera